Shir Ali Khan was the Khan of Kokand from June 1842 to 1845. He belonged to the Ming tribe that ruled Kokand.

He was the father of Muhammad Khudayar Khan and Muhammad Malla Beg Khan, and a cousin of Umar Khan and Alim Khan. After a popular revolt against the Bukhari occupation of Kokand, Nasrullah Khan and the puppet governor he installed, Ibrahim-Dadhoh was expelled to Khujand. Shir Ali struggled to revive the khanate from the brief but destructive occupation by Bukhari forces. In 1843 he managed to re-annex Tashkent to the khanate and take control of several other portions of land that were once part of the Kokand Khanate.

During his reign the Kirghiz and Qipchaq tribes began a struggle over control of the state. 

In 1845 Shir Ali was executed in Osh in a conspiracy led by the mingbashi Musulmonqul to overthrow him out of the belief that Kyrgyz Kipchaks had grown too powerful. Alim Khan's son Murad Beg killed Shir Ali and was briefly declared khan but soon overthrown because he was perceived as a puppet of Bukhara by the people of Kokand.

References

1792 births
1845 deaths
Khans of Kokand
19th-century monarchs in Asia
19th-century murdered monarchs